Pardaleodes edipus, the common pathfinder skipper, is a butterfly in the family Hesperiidae. It is found in Senegal, Guinea, Sierra Leone, Liberia, Ivory Coast, Ghana, Togo, Benin, Nigeria, Cameroon, Bioko, Gabon, the Republic of the Congo, the Central African Republic and the Democratic Republic of the Congo. The habitat consists of disturbed areas in forests.

Adult males are attracted to bird droppings.

References

Butterflies described in 1781
Erionotini